Courtney Brown is the name of:

Courtney Brown (athlete) (born 1965), Canadian Olympic sprinter
Courtney Brown (defensive back) (born 1984), American football player
Courtney Brown (defensive end) (born 1978), former American football player
Courtney Brown (researcher) (born 1952), proponent of remote viewing and teacher of political science
Courtney Browne (born 1970), Barbadian cricketer
Courtney Brown, Lloyd Bridges' SCUBA instructor and stunt double for Sea Hunt